HMS Parker (originally Frobisher) was a Parker-class flotilla leader of the British  Royal Navy, and the lead ship of her class. She was built by Cammell Laird during the First World War, being launched on 16 August 1916 and completing on 13 December that year. Parker served with the Grand Fleet for the rest of the war, which she survived. The ship was sold for scrap in November 1921.

Construction and design
The Parker-class was an improved version of the earlier  with the forward two funnels of the Marksman-class merged into one and the ships' bridge moved rearwards, allowing an improved gun layout.

The ship's main gun armament consisted of four QF  Mk IV guns mounted on the ships centreline, with the forward two guns superfiring so that one could fire over the other, with one gun between the second and third funnel and one aft. Two 2-pounder (40 mm) "pom-pom" anti-aircraft guns were fitted, while torpedo armament consisted of two sets of twin 21 inch (533 mm) torpedo tubes. The standard anti-submarine armament for flotilla leaders such as Parker from June 1916 onwards was two Type D depth charges on chutes, although the number of depth charges tended to increased as the war progressed and the importance of anti-submarine operations grew. The ship's complement was 116 officers and men.

Parker, named for Admiral Peter Parker, was laid down on 19 June 1915 and launched on 17 August 1916. She was commissioned on 13 November 1916.

Service
On commissioning, Parker joined the 15th Destroyer Flotilla of the Grand Fleet at Scapa Flow as leader with sister ship Grenville. From 15 June 1917 the destroyers and submarines of the Grand Fleet took part in Operation BB,  a large scale operation against German submarines, with 53 destroyers and leaders together with 17 submarines deployed on offensive patrols on the transit route for the Germans from the North Sea and around the Orkney and Shetland Islands to the Western Approaches. Parker led twelve destroyers of the 15th Flotilla on patrol to the east of Shetland. Overall, 61 sightings were made of German submarines were made by the destroyers and submarines of the Grand Fleet until the operation ended on 24 June, of which 12 resulted in attacks on the submarines, but no submarines were sunk or damaged. In July 1917, the 15th Flotilla moved to Rosyth. On 20 August 1917, Parker carried out an attack against a German submarine with depth charges. Despite these countermeasures, the two German light cruisers  and  managed to evade the patrols and attacked the regular convoy between Norway and Britain on 17 October, sinking nine merchant ships and two destroyers,  and  before returning safely to Germany.

She was paid off into reserve in December 1918, her crew joining the newly commissioned .

By July 1919, Parker was back in commission with the 5th Destroyer Flotilla of the Home Fleet, detached for operations in Irish waters. She remained in Irish waters until August 1919, and was reduced to reserve at Chatham in December 1919.

Fate
Parker was placed on the disposal list in February 1921 and was sold as part of a batch of nine destroyers to the ship breakers John Cashmore Ltd on 15 November 1921. The ship was removed from Chatham on 16 May 1923 for scrapping at Cashmore's Newport works.

Pennant numbers

Notes

Citations

References

 

 
 

Parker-class flotilla leaders
World War I destroyers of the United Kingdom
Ships built on the River Mersey
1916 ships